Scottville may refer to:

 Scottville, Queensland, in Australia
 Scottville, Illinois, in the United States
 Scottsville, Kentucky, in the United States, originally known as Scottville
 Scottville, Michigan, in the United States
 Scottville, North Carolina, in the United States
 Scottville, Virginia, in the United States (former name for Powhatan, Virginia)

See also
 Scottsville (disambiguation)